Eupithecia fuscicostata is a moth in the  family Geometridae. It is found in Romania, North Macedonia and Greece, as well as the Near East and Iran.

References

Moths described in 1887
fuscicostata
Moths of Europe
Moths of Asia